Niño de Murcia (Zeneta, Murcia) is a French flamenco singer and guitarist, born in Spain and moved to France at age of 20 years, known for his Spanish / Latin songs. He was signed to Disques Festival label that released most of his recordings. He sang mainly in Spanish, but also released a number of songs in French and a number of other languages and was famous internationally, notably in Europe, Africa and the Middle East. His Spanish language songs "El Emigrante" and "Esperanza" (originally by Charles Aznavour) remain iconic songs of the early 1960s in France, as well as his famous covers of many classics like "Granada", "Guantanamera", "Malagueña" etc.

Awards
Niño de Murcia won the "Grand Prix du Disque" award by the Académie du Disque Français.

Discography

Albums

Minis

Compilations
2007: Guitares, mes amies 
2015: Niño de Murcia: 50 succès essentiels 1957-1962 (2 CDs) 
Tracklist: CD 1: 1. "El emigrante" (3:27) 2. "Guitares, mes amies" (2:58) 3. "Jusqu'au bout du monde" (1:59) 4. "Antonio Vargas Heredia" (from Noche de Andalucía) (5:04) 5. "La tani" (from Vendetta en Camargue (2:59) 6. "El berebito" (2:38) 7. "Ay del ay (Bulerias)" (2:51) 8. "Mira mira" (3:13) 9. "Puentecito" (3:00) 10. "Celitos" (2:00) 11. "María Morena" (1:49) 12. "Historia de un amor" (2:38) 13. "Bolero gitano" (3:26) 14. "Luna serrana" (2:51) 15. "Du moment qu'on s'aime" (3:01) 16. "Amour d'Espagne" (2:44) 17. "Toute une année" (3:07) 18. "Vive Paris" (3:20) 19. "Les gitans" (3:55) 20. "Tanto tienes tanto vales" (2:46) 21. "Le gitan et la fille" (3:35) 22. "Camino verde" (3:47) 23. "Malagueña" (4:03) 24. "El soldado de levita" (2:53) 25. "Que nadie sepa mi sufrir" (2:41)  CD 2: 1. "Granada" (3:55) 2. "Vénus" (2:30) 3. "Melodía perdida" (2:39) 4. "Eva la Gitana" (from La Femme et le Pantin) (3:05) 5. "Murcia de mi sueños" (3:38) 6. "Valencia" (2:22) 7. "Angelitos negros" (2:27) 8. "Si vas a Calatayud" (3:12) 9. "Luna de miel" (3:03) 10. "Puerta del sol" (3:36) 11. "La caravana y el viento" (2:59) 12. Danse espagnole N°5 "Andalucia" (5:15) 13. "Noche a Río" (2:10) 14. "Esperanza" (2:57) 15. "Nostalgia India" (3:39) 16. "Mi jaca" (3:01) 17. "Mírame Morenita" (2:12) 18. "Mi flamenco twist" (2:07) 19. "Madrid" (2:32) 20. "Por tu amor" (2:43) 21. "Penalti" (2:34) 22. "Sinceridad" (2:45) 23. "Clavelitos" (2:42) 24. "El festival" (2:20) 25. "Adiós mi vida" (3:00)

References

External links
iTunes: Nino de Murcia
Discogs: Nino de Murcia discography

French male singers